Ten Years On: A Collection of Songs in Remembrance of September 11th 2001, or simply Ten Years On, is a tribute album created by Welsh singer-songwriter and record producer Jem to commemorate the tenth anniversary of the September 11 attacks. Money raised from sales of the album on iTunes was donated to the National September 11 Memorial & Museum.

Track listing 

"Adagio for Strings" – Leonard Bernstein & New York Philharmonic
"Imagine" – John Lennon
"New York City" – Suzzy & Maggie Roche
"Dear Old Friend" – Patty Griffin
"On the Turning Away" – Pink Floyd
"Every Grain of Sand" – Bob Dylan
"Pride (In the Name of Love)" – John Legend
"You Will Make It" – Jem feat. Vusi Mahlasela
"That I Would Be Good" – Alanis Morissette
"Time After Time" – Cyndi Lauper feat. Sarah McLachlan
"Sister (Live at Radio City)" – Dave Matthews & Tim Reynolds
"You and I" – Stevie Wonder
"I Know You By Heart" – Eva Cassidy
"Help Me" – Johnny Cash
"If I Rise" – Dido & A.R. Rahman
"Bridge over Troubled Water" – Simon & Garfunkel
"Gold Dust" – Tori Amos
"Good Night, New York" – Nanci Griffith
"You'll Never Walk Alone" – Nina Simone

See also 

 List of cultural references to the September 11 attacks
 List of tribute albums
 Memorials and services for the September 11 attacks

References

External links 
 Ten Years On – A Collection of Songs in Remembrance of September 11th 2001 by Yestyn (September 9, 2011), Glass Pear Music

2011 compilation albums
Charity albums
Tribute albums
Music about the September 11 attacks